William Komer (born 1988 or 1989) was a Canadian businessman and is a director and the chair of The United People of Canada organization.

Early life and education 
Komer studied computer science at the University of Western Ontario.

Career 
Komer owns five businesses located around London, Ontario including Campus Creative website company and Under the Umbrella wedding photography company. In 2016, he tried to buy the empty Lorne Avenue public school in London, to convert it into a "multi-generational meeting place".

He is also a director and the chair of The United People of Canada (TUPC) not for profit organization, that occupied Saint Brigid’s church and which has links to the Canada convoy protest. Komer signed an agreement on behalf of TUPC to buy the church for $5.95 million but the group failed to pay the deposit prior to being evicted.

Komer attended the Canada convoy protest, and told the Ottawa Citizen newspaper that he did so "as a documentary filmmaker".

In 2021, Komer's private prosecution of the police failed to convince the Ontario Superior Court of Justice that he suffered gender discrimination from the police during a domestic dispute.

Personal life 
Komer was aged 27 in 2016.

References

External links 
 Komer's Twitter

1980s births
Living people
Businesspeople from London, Ontario
Canadian company founders
University of Western Ontario alumni
Protesters involved in the Canada convoy protest